Paul David Noce (born  December 16, 1959) is an American former professional baseball player who played for the Chicago Cubs and the Cincinnati Reds of the Major League Baseball (MLB). He debuted on June 1, 1987, against the Houston Astros. He played in 70 games that year at second base, shortstop, and third base. He didn't appear in the majors again until 1990 with the Cincinnati Reds. He had only one at bat that season, in which he singled.

Career
Noce attended Washington State University, where he played college baseball for the Cougars from 1979 to 1981.

Coaching career
Noce served as a coach for the Pittsburgh Pirates in 1992 and 1993. He also coached for the Taepyungyang Dolphins of the KBO in 1993. He also served as the head baseball coach at Hillsdale College in Michigan from 1994 to 2013, stepping down after his 20th season. He notched his 300th win as coach in 2010.

In 2016 and 2017, he was the manager for the Eastside Diamond Hoppers of the United Shore Professional Baseball League.

References

External links

1959 births
Living people
American expatriate baseball players in Canada
American expatriate baseball people in South Korea
Baseball coaches from California
Baseball players from San Francisco
Calgary Cannons players
Chicago Cubs players
Cincinnati Reds players
Hillsdale Chargers baseball coaches
Indianapolis Indians players
Iowa Cubs players
KBO League coaches
Major League Baseball second basemen
Major League Baseball shortstops
Miami Marlins (FSL) players
Midland Cubs players
Minor league baseball managers
Nashville Sounds players
Phoenix Firebirds players
Pittsfield Cubs players
Reno Padres players
Reno Silver Sox players
Salem Redbirds players
Washington State Cougars baseball players